Ensjø is a station on the Oslo Metro located in the borough of Helsfyr. The station is shared by the Østensjø-, Lambertseter- and Furuset Line. It is the first station on the east side after emerging from the downtown Common Tunnel for these lines. The station is located between Tøyen and Helsfyr. Ensjø is mostly a commercial area, with many car dealerships. The station also serves Jordal Amfi, home arena of Vålerenga Ishockey.

References

External links

Oslo Metro stations in Oslo
Railway stations opened in 1966
1966 establishments in Norway